Barkuh Rural District is a rural district (dehestan) in Kuhsorkh County, Razavi Khorasan Province, Iran. At the 2006 census, its population was 11,963, in 3,241 families.  The rural district has 12 villages.

References 

Rural Districts of Razavi Khorasan Province
Kuhsorkh County